The R573 road is a regional road in Ireland. It is a coastal loop road from the R571 on the Beara Peninsula in County Kerry. Part of the road is on the Wild Atlantic Way.

The R573 travels west from the R571 via Tuosist. The road continues along the coast, via Bunaw Quay and Derreen Garden to rejoin the R571 at Lauragh.

References

Regional roads in the Republic of Ireland
Roads in County Kerry